A user fee is a fee, tax, or impost payment paid to a facility owner or operator by a facility user as a necessary condition for using the facility.

People pay user fees for the use of many public services and facilities. At the federal level in the United States, there is a charge for walking to the top of the Statue of Liberty, to drive into many national parks, and to use particular services of the Library of Congress.

States may charge tolls for driving on highways or impose a fee on those who camp in state parks. Communities usually have entrance fees for public swimming pools and meters for parking on local streets as well as perhaps even parking spaces at public beaches, dump stickers and postage stamps.

In international development, user fees refer to a system fee for basic health care, education, or other services implemented by a developing country to make up for the costs of these services.

The International Monetary Fund often recommends that nations start charging fees for these services in order to reduce their budget deficits. This position is more and more challenged by many people who claim that user fees  hurt the poorest the most. Some even argue that they should be free at the point of use.

The alternative to funding facilities and services with user fees is to fund them with income taxes.  Unlike user fees, income taxes are paid by everyone, including those who don't necessarily use or benefit from a specific facility or service.

References

Taxation in the United States
International development
Payments